Burnin' Sneakers is the second studio album by Bomfunk MC's, released in 2002 through Sony Music Entertainment.

personnel

Raymond Ebanks (a.k.a. B.O.W. or B.O. Dubb) vocals 

Ismo Lappalainen (a.k.a. DJ Gismo) dj, turntables, samples 

Ville Mäkinen (a.k.a. Mr Wily) bass, keyboards 

Ari Toikka (a.k.a. A.T.) drums, percussion 

Max'C vocals (on Live Your Life) 

Jessica Folcker vocals (on Something Going On) 

Mr B vocals (on Where’s the Party At) 

Jaakko Salovaara (a.k.a. JS16) producer

Track listing

References

2002 albums
Bomfunk MC's albums